Epiplatys is a genus of African rivuline in the family Nothobranchiidae endemic to Africa as the name indicates. Several of these species are popular aquarium fish.

Species
These are the currently recognized species in this genus:
 Epiplatys annulatus (Boulenger, 1915) (Banded panchax)
 Epiplatys ansorgii (Boulenger, 1911)
 Epiplatys atratus Van der Zee, Mbimbe & Sonnenberg, 2013
 Epiplatys barmoiensis Scheel, 1968
 Epiplatys biafranus Radda, 1970
 Epiplatys bifasciatus (Steindachner, 1881)
 Epiplatys cashneri 
 Epiplatys chaperi (Sauvage, 1882) (Toothed carp)
 Epiplatys chevalieri (Pellegrin, 1904)
 Epiplatys coccinatus Berkenkamp & Etzel, 1982
 Epiplatys dageti Poll, 1953
 Epiplatys dageti dageti Poll, 1953 (Redchin panchax)
 Epiplatys dageti monroviae Arnoult & Daget, 1965
 Epiplatys duboisi Poll, 1952 (Dubois' panchax)
 Epiplatys esekanus Scheel, 1968
 Epiplatys etzeli Berkenkamp, 1975
 Epiplatys fasciolatus (Günther, 1866)
 Epiplatys grahami (Boulenger, 1911)
 Epiplatys guineensis Romand, 1994
 Epiplatys hildegardae Berkenkamp, 1978
 Epiplatys huberi (Radda & Pürzl, 1981)
 Epiplatys infrafasciatus (Günther, 1866)
 Epiplatys josianae Berkenkamp & Etzel, 1983
 Epiplatys lamottei Daget, 1954 (Redspotted panchax)
 Epiplatys longiventralis (Boulenger, 1911)
 Epiplatys maeseni (Poll, 1941)
 Epiplatys mesogramma Huber, 1980
 Epiplatys multifasciatus (Boulenger, 1913)
 Epiplatys neumanni Berkenkamp, 1993
 Epiplatys njalaensis W. Neumann, 1976
 Epiplatys olbrechtsi Poll, 1941
 Epiplatys phoeniceps Huber, 1980
 Epiplatys roloffi Romand, 1978
 Epiplatys ruhkopfi Berkenkamp & Etzel, 1980
 Epiplatys sangmelinensis (C. G. E. Ahl, 1928)
 Epiplatys sexfasciatus T. N. Gill, 1862
 Epiplatys sexfasciatus rathkei Radda, 1970
 Epiplatys sexfasciatus sexfasciatus T. N. Gill, 1862 (Sixbar panchax)
 Epiplatys sexfasciatus togolensis Loiselle, 1971
 Epiplatys singa (Boulenger, 1899)
 Epiplatys spilargyreius (A. H. A. Duméril, 1861)
 Epiplatys zenkeri (C. G. E. Ahl, 1928)

References

 
Nothobranchiidae

Freshwater fish genera
Taxa named by Theodore Gill